Albion is a given name, usually masculine, which may refer to:

 Albion (Saxon), 8th century Germanic leader of the Saxons in the time of Charlemagne
 Albion Earnest Andrews, Commander of the Ceylon Defence Force (1927–1928)
 Albion Avdijaj (born 1994), Albanian footballer
 Albion Fellows Bacon (1865–1933), female American reformer and writer
 Albion Rajkumar Banerjee (1871–1950), Indian civil servant and administrator, Prime Minister of Kashmir from 1927 to 1929
 Albion P. Howe (1818–1897), American Civil War Union Army general
 Albion W. Knight, Jr. (1924–2012), second archbishop of the United Episcopal Church of North America
 Albion Parris (1788–1857), American politician and jurist
 Albion Woodbury Small (1854–1926), American sociologist, influential in the establishment of sociology as a valid field of academic study
 Albion W. Tourgée (1838–1905), American pioneer civil rights activist, soldier, lawyer, writer, politician and diplomat

Masculine given names